The Serna class, Russian designation Project 11770, is a class of air cavity system landing craft constructed for the Russian Navy. Twelve boats were built by Vostochnaya Verf between 1994 and 2014. Four boats of the export project 11771 were built in 1994.

4 ships of the Project 11771 designation were made specifically for export to other countries. One was sold to Estonia, and 3 were sold to the United Arab Emirates.

Deployment
During the 2022 Russian invasion of Ukraine, a Serna-class craft docked at Snake Island was destroyed when the island was attacked by a Ukrainian Bayraktar TB2 drone on 6 May 2022.

References

External links

Amphibious warfare vessel classes
Amphibious warfare vessels of the Russian Navy
Landing craft